Max Krogdahl (born 21 October 1998) is a Norwegian ice hockey player for Västerviks IK and the Norwegian national team.

He represented Norway at the 2021 IIHF World Championship.

References

External links

1998 births
Living people
Coventry Blaze players
Frisk Asker Ishockey players
Norwegian expatriate ice hockey people
Norwegian expatriate sportspeople in England
Norwegian expatriate sportspeople in Sweden
Norwegian ice hockey defencemen
Sportspeople from Bærum
Västerviks IK players